House II: The Second Story is a 1987 American comedy horror film written and directed by Ethan Wiley from an original story by Fred Dekker. It serves as the second installment in the House film series, and is a standalone sequel to the first movie. While the plots and characters are unrelated, House II involves a storyline centered around a new mansion with a supernatural connection. The tone is highlighted with a greater focus on comedy, with a tone even lighter than the original.

House II: The Second Story was released on August 28, 1987, grossing $10 million worldwide against a $3 million budget and received negative reviews from critics.

Plot
Young urban professionals Jesse McLaughlin (Arye Gross) and his girlfriend Kate (Lar Park Lincoln) move into an old mansion that has been in Jesse's family for generations. They are soon joined by Jesse's goofy friend Charlie Coriell (Jonathan Stark), who brought along his diva girlfriend Lana (Amy Yasbeck), in the hopes of being discovered by Kate, who works for a record company.

Jesse has returned to the old family mansion after his parents were murdered when he was a baby. While going through old things in the basement, Jesse finds a picture of his great-great-grandfather (and namesake) in front of an Aztec temple holding a crystal skull with sapphires in the eyes. In the background is a man Jesse learns is Slim Reeser, a former partner of his great-great-grandfather turned bitter enemy after a disagreement over who would get to keep the skull.

Reasoning that the skull must be buried with him, Jesse and Charlie decide to dig up Jesse's great-great-grandfather in the hopes of procuring the skull. They unearth the casket only to be attacked by the corpse (Royal Dano), who then shows himself to be friendly when Jesse reveals his identity as the senior Jesse's great-great-grandson. Jesse and Charlie take the cowboy zombie, nicknamed "Gramps", back to the house, where he is horrified to learn that the skull has not rejuvenated his body as he had hoped.

Gramps and Charlie go out drinking and driving, and later the boys listen for hours to Gramps' stories of the Old West and his outlaw life. Gramps explains that the house was built using stones from the Aztec temple, and that its rooms act as a hidden doorway across space and time, with the skull acting as a key. He charges Charlie and Jesse with defending the skull against the forces of evil, who are drawn to possess the skull.

During an impromptu Halloween party thrown by Charlie, Gramps makes an appearance (though he is overlooked as it is a costume party), Kate leaves Jesse (taking Lana with her) after he is seen with an old girlfriend by her smarmy boss John Statman (Bill Maher), and Jesse and Charlie pick up two new pets in the Jurassic era, a baby pterodactyl and a caterpillar-dog that's dubbed a Cater-Puppy, after a barbarian/caveman arrives at the party and steals the skull.

Bill Towner (John Ratzenberger), an electrician and "part-time adventurer", arrives to inspect the house's old wiring. While seemingly a buffoon, he pulls a short-sword from his tool case and leads the boys through "one of those time-portal things...you see these all the time in these old houses." In the mystic past, the three fight off a group of Aztec warriors and rescue an Aztec virgin who was about to be sacrificed.

Eventually, a zombified Slim Reeser makes his appearance. Still after the skull, Slim shoots Gramps who then gives Jesse his guns and reveals that it was Slim who shot and killed Jesse's parents when he was a baby. Jesse jumps through a window into the Old West, and eventually succeeds in killing Slim by blasting off his head with a rifle (or, maybe, a shotgun). Gramps, who has been mortally wounded, begins to pass away. Gramps says goodbye to Jesse and tells him he is so happy to have met his great-great-grandson. Gramps then gives a final warning about the power of the skull, encouraging Jesse to get what he wants from the enchanted object and then get rid of it. As Gramps passes, Jesse embraces him.

The film ends with the revelation that Jesse used the skull to travel back into the Old West, where he, Charlie and the rest of their friends drive off in a wagon on a new adventure, leaving the crystal skull behind, marking Gramps' new grave.

Cast
 Arye Gross as Jesse McLaughlin
 Jonathan Stark as Charlie Coriell
 Royal Dano as Gramps McLaughlin
 Bill Maher as John Statmen
 John Ratzenberger as Bill Towner
 Lar Park Lincoln as Kate
 Amy Yasbeck as Lana aka Puce Glitz
 Dwier Brown as Clarence
 Gregory Walcott as Sheriff
 Jayne Modean as Rochelle
 Lenora May as Judith
 Kane Hodder as Gorilla (also stunt coordinator)
 Frank Welker as the voices of Slim Reeser, Baby Pterodactyl and Cater Puppy
 Devin DeVasquez as the virgin

Reception
On Rotten Tomatoes the film has an approval rating of 9% based on reviews from 11 critics.

Ryan Pollard at Starburst wrote: "House II doesn't quite have anything similar to the strong performance of the original's Bill Katt anchoring the picture, but it still has plenty to make it a worthwhile follow-up that's definitely worth watching.". Creature Feature gave the movie two of five stars, finding it inferior to the first movie.

Comic adaptation

In October 1987, Marvel Comics released a comic book adaptation of House II. It was written by Ralph Macchio, with artwork by Alan Kupperberg on pencils and Kupperberg, Hilary Barta, Danny Bulanadi, Jose Marzan Jr. and Pat Redding on inks. Its cover price was $2.

Sequels
House II was followed by two sequels, with: House III: The Horror Show in 1989, and House IV: The Repossession in 1992. Each film was met with mixed critical and financial reception.

See also
La Casa (film series), an Italian rebranding of several otherwise unrelated horror films, including House II
List of ghost films

References

External links
 
 
  
 

1987 films
1980s comedy horror films
1987 independent films
1987 horror films
American comedy horror films
American independent films
American sequel films
Films scored by Harry Manfredini
Films adapted into comics
Films directed by Ethan Wiley
American haunted house films
New World Pictures films
American supernatural horror films
Crystal skull
Films with screenplays by Ethan Wiley
1980s English-language films
1980s American films
House (film series)